Artoriopsis expolita is a species of wolf spider from southern Australia.

Artoriopsis expolita is a common spider in open, moderately moist environments and is often found near creeks and rivers, in foredunes, on pasture, and on suburban lawns. Most adults are found between October and January, with females found carrying egg sacs between November and December and found carrying spiderlings from December to January. Between March and August, the species is rarely found.

This species has been reported to bite humans on several occasions, resulting in occasional minor swelling and redness around the bite area.

References
  (2007): Revision of the new Australian genus Artoriopsis in a new subfamily of wolf spiders, Artoriinae (Araneae: Lycosidae). Zootaxa 1391: 1-34. Abstract
  (2008): The world spider catalog, version 8.5. American Museum of Natural History.

Lycosidae
Spiders of Australia
Spiders described in 1877